The 1970–71 Duke Blue Devils men's basketball team represented Duke University in the 1970–71 NCAA Division I men's basketball season. The head coach was Bucky Waters and the team finished the season with an overall record of 20–10 and did not qualify for the NCAA tournament.

References 

Duke Blue Devils men's basketball seasons
Duke
Duke
Duke Blue Devils
Duke Blue Devils